Valar may refer to:

 Valar in Middle-earth, angelic or godlike beings in J. R. R. Tolkien's Middle-earth fantasy
 Valár, a village in Romania
 Valar Ventures, a venture fund
 Valär, a surname: see :Category:Van Leer family